Lankao railway station is a station on Longhai railway in Lankao County, Kaifeng, Henan.

History
The station was established in 1915 as Lancun railway station.

The station was renamed to the current name in 1954 when Lanfeng County and Kaocheng County merged to form Lankao County.

See also
 Lankao South railway station

References

Railway stations in Henan
Stations on the Longhai Railway
Railway stations in China opened in 1915